Helmut von Bidder was a Swiss rower. He rowed for Basler RC. He was European champion in the double scull event with his partner Hans Hottinger in 1930, 1931, and 1934. They were Swiss champions several time. Two grandsons, Florian von Bidder (born 1973) and Lukas von Bidder (born 1976), represented Switzerland in rowing.

References

Year of birth missing
Year of death missing
Swiss male rowers
Sportspeople from Basel-Stadt
European Rowing Championships medalists